List of Slovenian domestic animal breeds lists Slovenian local breeds of domesticated animals. This list includes all animal breeds that are locally adapted in Slovenia, being either autochthonous either traditional. The most widespread classification lists 15 (or 16) Slovenian autochthonous breeds, while there are 13 recognized Slovenian traditional breeds.

Slovenian autochthonous breeds are Styrian Hen, Bosnian Mountain Horse, Lipizzan, Posavac, Slovenian Cold-blood, Cika cattle, Krškopolje pig, Bela Krajina Pramenka, Bovec sheep, Jezersko-Solčava sheep, Improved Jezersko-Solčava sheep, Istrian milk, Drežnica goat, Karst Shepherd dog and Carniolan honey bee (some also include marble trout). Slovenian traditional breeds are as follows: Slovenian Barred Hen, Slovenian Brown Hen, Slovene Late-feathered Hen, Slovenian Silver Hen, Haflinger, Ljutomer Trotter, Braunvieh, Fleckvieh, Slovenian Landrace – line 11, Slovenian Landrace – line 55, Slovenian Large White, Slovenian Alpine goat and Slovenian Saanen goat.

Division of Slovenian breeds 
Slovenian breeds:

 Local (locally adapted) breeds
 Autochthonous breeds
 Traditional breeds
 Introduced breeds
 Allochthonous breeds
 Exotic breeds

Autochthonous breeds 
Autochthonous breeds are all of those domestic animal breeds that originate from the Slovenian area and have historical documents, proving their country of origin. Some autochthonous breeds are cross-border and have been developed in various countries, meaning they can be recognized as autochthonous in multiple countries.

Additional mandatory conditions, that define and determine a status of autochthonous breed, are a breed register, a breed standard and limited, as well as supervised influx of other breeds' genes. Slovenian laws require autochthonous breeds to have a breed register of at least five animal generations, bred in Slovenia. Before obtaining the status of autochthonous a breed has to have a title of traditional breed.

Poultry

Horses

Cattle

Pigs

Sheep

Goats

Dogs 

In the past Slovenian cynologists made some major contributions to breeding three additional Yugoslavian dog breeds, which were later assigned to Croatia and Montenegro by Fédération Cynologique Internationale. These breeds are Montenegrin Mountain Hound, now belonging to Montenegro, Posavac Hound and Istrian Hound (Coarse-haired and Short-haired) – both owned by Croatia.

Other 

Some classifications of Slovenian autochthonous breeds also include marble trout (Salmo marmoratus).

Traditional breeds 
Unlike an autochthonous breed a Slovenian traditional breed does not originate from the Slovenian area (it is of foreign origin). However a traditional breed has a long history of breeding in the region of Republic of Slovenia.

The Official Gazette, number 77/04, titled List of autochthonous and traditional breeds of domestic animals, requires Slovenian traditional breeds to be continuously bred by Slovenian breeders for at least 30 years (for poultry, pigs, sheep, goats and cattle) or 50 years (for other species). Another mandatory condition is an existence of breed register that proves a breed is being raised in Slovenia for at least 5 generations.

An additional requirement is a proper breed's name; a Slovenian traditional breed should have the word "slovenska" ("Slovenian") or a name of any other Slovene human settlement in its name.

Poultry 

In the past the Slovene Early-feathered Hen and Slovenian Fathering Hen were also included among Slovenian traditional breeds of domestic animals. In 2013 financial problems caused both breeds to be removed from the list of Slovenian heavy locally adapted chicken breeds, making the Slovene Late-feathered Hen the only currently listed breed.

Horses

Cattle

Pigs

Goats

References